Thalia Fortescue Massie (February 14, 1911 – July 3, 1963) was a member of a socially prominent U.S. family involved in  a series of heavily publicized trials in Hawaii.

Family life
Thalia Fortescue was born February 14, 1911, in Washington, DC. Her mother was Grace Hubbard Fortescue (1883–1979) and father was Granville Roland Fortescue (1875–1952).
She married Navy lieutenant Thomas Hedges Massie (1905–1987), who was stationed at Pearl Harbor.

The cases

In September 1931, Thalia Massie was found by a passing driver, Eustace Bellinger, wandering along Ala Moana Road in Honolulu at about 1 am on a Sunday morning. She had been beaten and had suffered a broken jaw after being abducted while leaving a party at the nearby Ala Wai Inn. When questioned by Bellinger and his passenger George Clark, Jr., she stated that a group of 5 or 6 Hawaiian boys had assaulted her.  Later at the hospital she claimed to police that she had been raped as well as assaulted.

Subsequently, five young men, Horace Ida, Henry Chang, Joseph Kahahawai, Benny Ahakuelo, and David Takai, two of Hawaiian ancestry, two of Japanese ancestry, and one of half Chinese/Hawaiian ancestry, who were initially arrested for assaulting a Hawaiian woman, Agnes Peeples, earlier that same night were later also charged with the rape of Massie.  Joseph Kahahawai, a boxer, admitted to the earlier assault on Peeples, whom he had slugged and knocked over during a road rage incident at King and Liliha Streets, but all defendants denied having been involved in the assault on Mrs. Massie.  The men were represented by two of the foremost criminal lawyers in the islands, William Heen and William B. Pittman, and the mixed-race jury deadlocked along racial lines. The five defendants were released on bail to await retrial at a later date.  

Thalia's mother, Grace Fortescue, was deeply disturbed by the release of the defendants and many U.S. Navy personnel at Pearl Harbor were outraged.  A short time later, Joseph Kahahawai was abducted when leaving the courthouse after a probation hearing and was found, shot dead, in the back seat of Grace Fortescue's car.  Defended by attorney Clarence Darrow of the Scopes Monkey Trial fame, Fortescue, Thalia's husband Thomas Massie, and two Navy sailors were eventually tried and convicted of manslaughter in the death of Kahahawai.  Originally sentenced to 10 years, their sentence was commuted to one hour in the executive chambers of Governor Lawrence Judd of the Territory of Hawaii.  

Thomas and Thalia Massie divorced on February 23, 1934, in Reno, Nevada.  In 1953, at the age of 42, Thalia married 21 year old Robert Thomlinson Uptigrove. They divorced in 1955. She died of an overdose of barbiturate pills in Palm Beach, Florida, on July 3, 1963.

Family Tree

See also
Massie Trial

References

External links

"Massie case," Kelli Y. Nakamura, Densho Encyclopedia (17 Aug 2013).

People from Washington, D.C.
People from Hawaii
Politics of Hawaii
1911 births
1963 deaths
American victims of crime
Drug-related deaths in Florida
Barbiturates-related deaths
American people of Dutch descent
Roosevelt family
Schuyler family